Southern Jewish History is an annual peer-reviewed academic journal of Jewish and Southern history. It is published by the Southern Jewish Historical Society and was established in 1998. Its editor in chief is Mark K. Bauman. Its managing editor is Bryan Edward Stone.

External links
 
 Southern Jewish Historical Society

History of the United States journals
Annual journals
Publications established in 1998
English-language journals